Sharifah Aisha Retno Sayed Sipulijam (born 1 August 2000) is a Malaysian singer-songwriter and actress. In 2020, Retno participated in the singing competition Vokal Mania. She came to prominence in the Malaysian music industry after the release of her English-language single, "W.H.U.T", in late 2021/early 2022. In 2022, she was a contestant on season 4 of Big Stage, placing third overall.

Personal life and education 
Retno was born to a Malay father and a Javanese mother. Her mother is the Indonesian kroncong singer, Jean Retno Aryani, who was active in the 1980s. Her father, Sayed Sipulijam Sayed Alwee, is a business man. She has a younger brother, Sayed Abu Hanifa Radityo. 

She was the champion of the Suara Emas, representing Kuala Lumpur on the national level, whilst in Form 4.

She holds a Bachelor's degree in Economics from the University of Malaya.

Career 
She released her debut single "Mengikat Jiwa" after signing with Sony Music Malaysia, in 2018. The single was produced by Indonesian composer, Aldi Nadi Permana and was recorded in Indonesia. 

In August 2020, Retno released the single "Terima Kasih", a duet with Yuka Kharisma. She partook in Sony Music Malaysia's Bring The Beat campaign alongside other artists including Sandra Dianne, Benzooloo and B-Heart, the campaign aimed to encourage artists to produce more songs

Retno initially rose to prominence on the TV3 singing talent show, Vokal Mania. She won the competition and was named Rookie Champion. In January 2021, Retno released her single "Cinta Denganmu".

On 9 December 2021, Aisha released an English-language track, "W.H.U.T." ("Wanna Hold U Tight"). The single did well on Spotify gaining up to 7 million streams on the platform within two months of release. The single debuted at number 3 on the RIM domestic/Malay singles charts.

She was selected as one of the 11 contestants in the fourth season of Big Stage, she finished in third place. Retno made her acting debut in the 2022 Malaysian telemovie, Cangkul, as the character Zura. On 29 July 2022, Retno released her single "Sutera".

Discography

Singles

Filmography

Television

Awards and nominations

References

External links

2000 births
Living people
Malaysian singer-songwriters
Malaysian people of Javanese descent
Malaysian people of Malay descent
Malaysian actresses
Malay-language singers
Malaysian Muslims
21st-century Malaysian women singers
People from Kuala Lumpur
University of Malaya alumni
Malaysian women pop singers